is a 1966 Japanese tokusatsu kaiju television series created by Eiji Tsuburaya. Produced by Tsuburaya Productions, it is the first series of the long-running Ultraman franchise, and was broadcast on Tokyo Broadcasting System (TBS) from January 2 to July 3, 1966 (the final episode was preempted until December 14, 1967), with a total of 28 episodes. This series was followed two weeks later by the more popular Ultraman (1966), the second Ultra Series.

Ultra Q can be described as a half-hour Toho kaiju series. Executive producer Eiji Tsuburaya intended this series to be more like the American television series The Twilight Zone and  The Outer Limits, featuring a variety of strange and unusual stories. After a survey, the TBS network convinced Tsuburaya Productions to add more giant monsters, as children were intensely interested in them, since Godzilla (Gojira) and Gamera were all the rage at the time (the first "Kaiju Boom" took off after Ultra Q became an enormous hit). Much like The X-Files, the series features continuing characters who investigate strange supernatural phenomena, including giant monsters, aliens, ghosts, and various other threats.

The originally planned title of this project was Unbalance, and was subsequently renamed Ultra Q mostly due to the word "Ultra" gaining popularity due to the Japanese gymnast Gold Medal recipient in the 1964 Summer Olympics using a technique named "Ultra C". The "Q" stands for "Question" and is also tied with another hit TBS series, Obake no Q-tarō, an animated series based on the manga by Fujiko Fujio. The series began production in 1964, with the premiere set for January 1966. At the time, this was the most expensive television series ever produced in Japan.

Characters
: Aviator at Hoshikawa Air Service and amateur SF writer.
: Reporter for the Daily News.
: Jun's aviation partner at Hoshikawa.
: world-renowned scientist, and occasional assistance to Jun, Yuriko and Ippei in times of crisis.
: Yuriko's boss and editor at the Daily News.

Monsters

Because of his stature as a filmmaker, and with his close relationship with Toho (they were investors in, and on the Board of Directors at, Tsuburaya Productions), Eiji Tsuburaya was ordered by his crew to take what they needed from the prop warehouse, where the various props from his films were stored, for use on the series. The large Manda prop was used for the dragon Kairyu (while the head was used as the front portion of a Viking ship seen in episode 12), as well as the giant octopus prop from Frankenstein vs. Baragon became Sudar, while the Maguma suit from Gorath was repurposed as Todora. Other suits and props were refurbished to play some of the monsters, such as Godzilla for Gomess, King Kong for Goroh, Baragon for Pagos, and a small, mechanical Rodan prop was stripped down and rebuilt as the bird monsters Litra and Largeus, respectively.

Episodes

English dub

In 1967, Ultra Q was licensed from Tsuburaya and TBS by CBS Films, producers of The Twilight Zone. For the task of dubbing, CBS hired Film House in Toronto, Canada, what is now DeLuxe Toronto. Tsuburaya provided translated scripts, plus English language opening and closing credits, and a custom, swirling title-card. The series itself was dubbed in its 28-episode entirety. At some point, CBS Films backed out of licensing the series, and it was picked up, along with Ultraman, by United Artists Television, producers of The Outer Limits. Subsequently, United Artists Television hired Titra Studios to dub Ultraman. Ultraman was syndicated, however, Ultra Q was not, due to being in black-and-white at a time when most television was switching to color. After Ultraman finished its run in syndication, audio and film masters, and other materials, for both series went into storage, eventually finding their way into the MGM vaults, after MGM acquired United Artists in 1980.

Initially it was commonly believed, even by Tsuburaya Productions, that only one episode, Episode 3 ("Gift From Outer Space"), was dubbed into English as a pilot. Over the last decade, other episodes have been discovered in the hands of U.S. private collectors on the 16mm film format.

Radio drama
In 2003, a weekly radio drama series was produced called The Ultra Q Club. It featured voice acting from the original Ultra Q cast.

Legacy
In the years following the show's original run, a live action film called Ultra Q The Movie: Legend of the Stars was released in 1990. In 2004, a new series called Ultra Q: Dark Fantasy was produced, while another series called Neo Ultra Q began airing in early 2013.

Production
The original concept of the show (when it was going to be called Unbalance) was ultimately used for a 13-episode horror anthology series entitled Horror Theater Unbalance that was produced by Tsuburaya Productions in 1973.

Various Ultra Q monsters were reused or redressed for various monsters in Ultraman. Kemur and Ragon (both of them now giant-sized) returned, while the Garamon suit was reused and repaired to serve as Pigmon. Other suits were altered to play other monsters, such as Peguila being altered into Chandorah, Kemur being altered into Alien Zetton, Pagos being altered into Neronga (and later Magular and Gabora), while the head of the Cicada Man was modified to become the head of Alien Baltan. Finally, Peter's suit was modified to become that of Gesura.

Home media

Japan
In 2013, Tsuburaya Productions and Bandai Visual released the series on Blu-ray, in monochrome and colorized editions. In 2018, Tsuburaya released four episodes in individual Blu-ray and DVD sets with newly produced special features, as part of their Ultraman Archives project. In November 2019, Tsuburaya released a 4K restoration of the series on Ultra HD Blu-ray.

North America
In August 2013, Shout! Factory released the series on DVD. In July 2019, Mill Creek Entertainment announced that it had acquired most of the Ultra series library from Tsuburaya Productions through Indigo Entertainment, including 1,100 TV episodes and 20 films. Mill Creek released the series on Blu-ray and digital on October 15, 2019, in standard and steelbook sets.

In July 2020, Shout! Factory announced to have struck a multi-year deal with Alliance Entertainment and Mill Creek, with the blessings of Tsuburaya and Indigo, that granted them the exclusive SVOD and AVOD digital rights to the Ultra series and films (1,100 TV episodes and 20 films) acquired by Mill Creek the previous year. Ultra Q, amongst other titles, will stream in the United States and Canada through Shout! Factory TV and Tokushoutsu.

References

Bibliography
The Q-Files, Complete Ultra Q Episode Guide by Jim Cirronella & Kevin Grays, Originally published in Kaiju-Fan #4 (November 1996) .
Great Encyclopedia of Ultra Monsters (orig.: ウルトラ怪獣大全集), Domdom (1995), 
So Crazy Japanese Toys!, by Jimbo Matison, Chronicle Books (2003), 
The Ultra Bizarre World of Ultra Q (Parts 1–3) by Mike Bianco. Originally published in G-Fan #62-64, May 2003-December 2003.

External links

Official website of Tsuburaya Productions 
Ultraman Connection — Official website 
Official Ultraman channel at YouTube

 
1966 Japanese television series debuts
1966 Japanese television series endings
Japanese science fiction television series
Japanese anthology television series
Ultra television series
TBS Television (Japan) original programming
Fiction about giants